Umrana Janoobi is a village situated at the bank of Jhelum River in Jhang District of Punjab, Pakistan.

The sub-tribe Umrana Sial of Sial tribe is the dominant tribe in this village.

The village is divided into its main settlements:
Basti Hamdani
Basti Hashmani
Basti Kharyani 
Basti Dulyani
Basti Mumtani, also known as Raakh wala Khoh.
Basti Sadyani 
Basti Hamboani 
Basti Budhyani
Basti Kamrani, also known as Kamrana /Hamaom wala Khoh
Basti Salyani
Bilherr
5 Marla Scheme
7 Marla Scheme
40 Wala Pattan
Bindi
Chhallay Wala

Education:

The village has a total of two government primary schools (one for boys and the other for girls).

Health:

Unfortunately, there is no public health care unit in this village. Residents rush towards the nearest THQ hospital in Athara Hazari Tehsil.

Crops:

Wheat, Sugarcane, Rice, and Cotton etc.

Weather:

People enjoy all-weather in this area.

The temperature crosses 45 degrees at Celsius scale in Summer Season and in Winter it goes to 0 degrees.

Games: 

Pehlwani, Gillidanda, Horse Riding, Kabaddi, Bhangra (music), Cricket.

Language and Culture:

Punjabi and Urdu are the mostly spoken language of this village.

Most of the people wear shalwar kameez while old age people prefer to wear chaadar (laacha and lungi) with kameez.

For footwear, people prefer "Khussa" during cultural and religious festivals.

Religion:

100% Islam.

Nearest Places:

Jhang 35 km away by road distance.

Athara Hazari 3 km 

THQ Hospital 4 km

Tehsil Offices and Police Station 3 km

Nadra Office 3 km

High School and College 3 km

Trimmu Barrage 8 km

 Populated places in Jhang District